The list of shipwrecks in March 1823 includes some ships sunk, foundered, grounded, or otherwise lost during the month of March 1823.

1 March

2 March

3 March

4 March

5 March

6 March

7 March

8 March

9 March

10 March

11 March

12 March

15 March

16 March

18 March

19 March

20 March

21 March

22 March

24 March

25 March

26 March

27 March

29 March

30 March

Unknown date

References

1823-03